CYBA or Cyba may refer to:

 CYBA (gene), the human gene that ecodes Cytochrome b-245, alpha polypeptide
 Cyba Audi (born 1965), Lebanese communication strategist and entrepreneur
 Banff Airport